Odetta and the Blues is an album by folk singer Odetta, released in 1962.

Recorded as the 1950s/1960s American folk music revival was getting underway, the album is notable for Odetta's use of a jazz band on the record.

It has subsequently been re-released on CD in 1984 on Riverside/Original Blues Classics (OBCCD-509-2), Ace (509) (1993) and Legacy (354).

Track listing 
All songs are traditional unless otherwise noted.
 "Hard, Oh Lord" - 4:09
 "Believe I'll Go" - 3:05
 "Oh, Papa" - 3:18
 "How Long Blues" (Leroy Carr) - 2:10
 "Hogan's Alley" - 2:12
 "Leavin' This Morning" - 2:50
 "Oh, My Babe" - 4:23
 "Yonder Comes the Blues" - 2:51
 "Make Me a Pallet on the Floor" - 3:49
 "Weeping Willow Blues" (Paul Carter) - 2:36
 "Go Down, Sunshine" - 2:21
 "Nobody Knows You When You're Down and Out" (Jimmy Cox) - 2:20

Personnel
Odetta – vocals
Buck Clayton – trumpet
Vic Dickenson – trombone
Herb Hall – clarinet
Dick Wellstood – piano
Ahmed Abdul-Malik – bass
Berisford "Shep" Shephard – drums

Production notes
Arrangements – Dick Wellstood
Recording engineer – Ray Fowler

References

External links
[ Odetta and The Blues on Allmusic]

Odetta albums
1962 albums
Riverside Records albums
Albums produced by Orrin Keepnews